Tommy Robredo defeated Radek Štěpánek in the final, 6–1, 6–3, 6–3 to win the singles tennis title at the 2006 Hamburg Masters.

Roger Federer was the two-time reigning champion, but withdrew due to fatigue.

Seeds 
A champion seed is indicated in bold text while text in italics indicates the round in which that seed was eliminated.

  Roger Federer (withdrew due to fatigue)
  Rafael Nadal (withdrew due to fatigue)
  Ivan Ljubičić (second round)
  Nikolay Davydenko (quarterfinals)
  James Blake (third round)
  Gastón Gaudio (second round)
  Fernando González (third round)
  Tommy Robredo (champion)
  Nicolas Kiefer (second round)
  Guillermo Coria (first round)
  Thomas Johansson (first round)
  Mario Ančić (semifinals)
  Jarkko Nieminen (third round)
  Robby Ginepri (first round)
  Radek Štěpánek (final)
  David Ferrer (quarterfinals)

Draw

Finals

Top half

Section 1

Section 2

Bottom half

Section 3

Section 4

External links 
 2006 Hamburg Masters draw
 2006 Hamburg Masters Qualifying draw

Singles